The International Grand Prix Al-Khor was a one day road cycling race held in Qatar. Only one edition was held. It was part of UCI Asia Tour in category 1.2.

Winners

References

UCI Asia Tour races
2008 establishments in Qatar
Cycle races in Qatar
2008 in road cycling
2008 in Qatari sport
Defunct cycling races in Qatar
December 2008 sports events in Asia